Jack Michael Delaney (August 27, 1930 – September 22, 1975) was an American jazz trombonist, active principally in the New Orleans jazz scene.

Early life and education 
Delaney was born in New Orleans and attended Southeastern Louisiana College.

Career 
Delaney played professionally with Johnny Reininger from 1949 to 1951. For much of the 1950s he worked with Sharkey Bonano and Tony Almerico in various settings, and also played as a sideman for Raymond Burke, Ken Colyer, Pete Fountain, Monk Hazel, Leon Kellner, and Lizzie Miles. He also led his own bands, which included Alvin Alcorn, Lee Collins, and Rollie Culver.

References
"Jack Delaney". The New Grove Dictionary of Jazz. 2nd edition, ed. Barry Kernfeld.

American jazz trombonists
Male trombonists
Jazz musicians from New Orleans
1930 births
1975 deaths
20th-century trombonists
20th-century American male musicians
American male jazz musicians
Southland Records artists